Pytheas of Athens was an orator who wrote speeches and other works. Considered an insolent man by his contemporaries, Pytheas opposed fellow orators Demosthenes and Demades.

He was against the deification of Alexander the Great. When other statesmen told him that he was not yet of an age to give advice on such matter of importance, he replied that he was older than Alexander, whom they wanted to make a god.

In 323 BC, he was a persecutor of Demosthenes in the Harpalus bribery scandal.

Following the death of Alexander the Great in 323 BC, he opposed Demosthenes, who attempted to create an anti-Macedonian front. Together with another Athenian orator, Callimedon, Pytheas fled to Athens for the camp of Antipater and traveled through the ancient Greek world to prevent the other Greek cities from attaching themselves to Athens.

References

Attic orators
4th-century BC Greek people
People associated with Alexander the Great